The 1995 Indianapolis Colts season was the 43rd season for the team in the National Football League and 12th in Indianapolis. The Indianapolis Colts finished the National Football League's 1995 season with a record of 9 wins and 7 losses, and finished tied for second in the AFC East division with the Miami Dolphins. However, the Colts finished ahead of Miami based on head-to-head sweep (2–0).

The Colts' 9–7 record was good enough to get them into the playoffs for the first time since 1987, largely due to the insertion of Jim Harbaugh into the starting quarterback role.  They defeated the defending conference champion San Diego Chargers in their first playoff game, then upset the top-seeded Kansas City Chiefs in the Divisional Playoffs. The Colts would fall short in the AFC Championship Game against the Pittsburgh Steelers in a game that came down to the final play.

Offseason

1995 Expansion Draft

NFL draft

Undrafted free agents

Transactions
July 29: The Indianapolis Colts signed wide receiver Wendell Davis

Personnel

Staff

Roster

Pre season

Schedule

Preseason Game summaries

Week P1 (Friday, August 4, 1995): vs. Cincinnati Bengals 

Point spread: 
 Over/Under: 
 Time of Game:

Week P2 (Saturday, August 12, 1995): at Seattle Seahawks 

Point spread: 
 Over/Under: 
 Time of Game:

Week P3 (Saturday, August 19, 1995): at Green Bay Packers 

Point spread: 
 Over/Under: 
 Time of Game:

Week P4 (Thursday, August 24, 1995): vs. Chicago Bears

Regular season

Schedule

Game summaries

Week 1 (Sunday, September 3, 1995): vs. Cincinnati Bengals 

Point spread: 
 Over/Under: 
 Time of Game: 3 hours, 16 minutes

Week 2 at Jets

Week 3 (Sunday, September 17, 1995): at Buffalo Bills 

Point spread: 
 Over/Under: 
 Time of Game: 2 hours, 59 minutes

Week 4: BYE WEEK

Week 5 (Sunday, October 1, 1995): vs. St. Louis Rams 

Point spread: 
 Over/Under: 
 Time of Game: 3 hours, 11 minutes

Week 6 (Sunday, October 8, 1995): at Miami Dolphins 

Point spread: 
 Over/Under: 
 Time of Game: 3 hours, 17 minutes

Week 7 (Sunday, October 15, 1995): vs. San Francisco 49ers 

Point spread: 
 Over/Under: 
 Time of Game: 3 hours, 1 minute

Week 8 (Sunday, October 22, 1995): at Oakland Raiders 

Point spread: 
 Over/Under: 
 Time of Game: 3 hours, 4 minutes

Week 9 (Sunday, October 29, 1995): vs. New York Jets 

Point spread: 
 Over/Under: 
 Time of Game: 2 hours, 44 minutes

Week 10 (Sunday, November 5, 1995): at Buffalo Bills 

Point spread: 
 Over/Under: 
 Time of Game: 3 hours, 4 minutes

Week 11 (Sunday, November 12, 1995): at New Orleans Saints 

Point spread: 
 Over/Under: 
 Time of Game: 2 hours, 51 minutes

Week 12 (Sunday, November 19, 1995): at New England Patriots 

Point spread: 
 Over/Under: 
 Time of Game: 2 hours, 51 minutes

Week 13 (Sunday, November 26, 1995): vs. Miami Dolphins 

Point spread: 
 Over/Under: 
 Time of Game: 3 hours, 13 minutes

Week 14 (Sunday, December 3, 1995): at Carolina Panthers 

Point spread: 
 Over/Under: 
 Time of Game: 3 hours, 9 minutes

Week 15 (Sunday, December 10, 1995): at Jacksonville Jaguars 

Point spread: 
 Over/Under: 
 Time of Game: 3 hours, 4 minutes

Week 16 (Sunday, December 17, 1995): vs. San Diego Chargers 

Point spread: 
 Over/Under: 
 Time of Game: 3 hours, 30 minutes

Week 17 (Saturday, December 23, 1995): vs. New England Patriots 

Point spread: 
 Over/Under: 
 Time of Game: 2 hours, 55 minutes

Standings

Playoffs 

The team received Wild-Card playoff berth for the playoffs and traveled to San Diego to play the Chargers. They went on to beat the Chargers, their 1st playoff win in 24 years and 1st in Indianapolis. They also won their Divisional Round game against the No. 1 seed Kansas City Chiefs but would fall short in the AFC Championship game to the Pittsburgh Steelers. This game indirectly led to the adoption of instant replay.

Playoff Game summaries

AFC Wild Card Playoffs (Sunday, December 31, 1995): at (A4) San Diego Chargers 

Point spread: 
 Over/Under: 
 Time of Game: 3 hours, 5 minutes

AFC Divisional Playoffs (Sunday, January 7, 1996): at (A1) Kansas City Chiefs 

Point spread: 
 Over/Under: 
 Time of Game: 3 hours, 8 minutes

AFC Championship Game (Sunday, January 14, 1996): at (A2) Pittsburgh Steelers 

Point spread: 
 Over/Under: 
 Time of Game: 2 hours, 59 minutes

Awards and records
 Jim Harbaugh, NFL Passing Leader, (Passer Rating 100.7)
 Jim Harbaugh, NFL Comeback Player of the Year

See also 
History of the Indianapolis Colts
Indianapolis Colts seasons
Colts–Patriots rivalry
1995 AFC Championship game

References

Indianapolis Colts
Indianapolis Colts seasons
Colts